Castle in the Clouds (or Lucknow) is a 16-room mansion and  mountaintop estate in Moultonborough, New Hampshire, opened seasonally to the public by the Castle Preservation Society. It overlooks Lake Winnipesaukee and the Ossipee Mountains from a rocky outcropping of Lee Mountain formerly known as "The Crow's Nest".

History
The home was built in 1913–1914 in the Craftsman style by the millionaire shoe manufacturer Thomas Gustave Plant (1859–1941) for his second wife, Olive Cornelia Dewey. He named the estate Lucknow for unknown reasons. He had no known connection to Lucknow in India. A poem by Olive reads "In the twilit hall, by the open fire / Each one agrees, 'I'm in Luck Now at last", suggesting that it was a play on words. The property was assembled from the private Ossipee Mountain Park, an observation area called the Crow's Nest, and a variety of other lodges and buildings. He razed the structures and built the mansion, a stable/garage, gatehouses, a greenhouse, farm buildings, and a golf course.

Designed by the prominent Boston architect J. Williams Beal (assisted by his sons John W. Beal and Horatio Beal), the house included many innovations which were rare at the time, including a circular shower, interlocking kitchen tiles, and a central vacuum system. The interiors were designed by Irving & Casson-A.H. Davenport. Bronze and tile work were by William Jackson & Company; electric fixtures by Edward F. Caldwell & Co.; and glass by Tiffany.

After Plant lost his money in a series of bad investments in the 1930s, the house was foreclosed upon, but his creditors allowed him to stay in the mansion until his death, and the furnishings remained with the house. Plant died in 1941, and the property was purchased by Fred C. Tobey to log its hardwoods and serve as a family summer home. The estate was sold to Richard and Donald Robie in 1956, who opened it as a tourist attraction.

Castle in the Clouds is today owned and operated by the Castle Preservation Society, a private 501(c)(3) non-profit corporation. The Castle, Carriage House, gift shop, art gallery and Cafe and Patio are open to the public from late May to early October. The property was listed on the National Register of Historic Places in 2018.

Notes

References
 Ellen Albanese, "N.H. castle built on shoes, love, a grand vision", Boston Globe, August 3, 2008. full text
 Eric Jones, New Hampshire Curiosities, Globe Pequot Press, 2006, p. 153. .
 Larissa Mulkern, "A Home Ahead of Its Time", New Hampshire Home, Fall 2007. full text
 Barry H. Rodrigue, A Castle in the Clouds: Tom Plant and the American Dream, Bath: Archipelago, 2015.
 Bryant Franklin Tolles, Summer Cottages in the White Mountains: The Architecture of Leisure and Recreation, 1870 to 1930, University Press of New England, 2000. .
 Bryant Franklin Tolles, Carolyn K. Tolles, New Hampshire Historical Society, New Hampshire Architecture, University Press of New England, 1979, p. 270. .

External links
 Official site
 Site about Lucknow by the grandson of Fred C. Tobey

Historic house museums in New Hampshire
Houses completed in 1914
Museums in Carroll County, New Hampshire
Protected areas of Carroll County, New Hampshire
Houses in Carroll County, New Hampshire
Moultonborough, New Hampshire
National Register of Historic Places in Carroll County, New Hampshire
Houses on the National Register of Historic Places in New Hampshire